A tranquilizer is a drug that induces tranquility.

Tranquilizer may also refer to:

"Tranquilizer", a song written by Tom Stephan with vocals by Neil Tennant, from album Superchumbo "WowieZowie" (2005)
 "Транквилизатор" ("Tranquilizer"), a song by the Soviet band Кино (Kino) from the album Nachalnik Kamchatki (1984)

See also
 Tranquil (disambiguation)
 Tranquillity
 Sedative
 Tranquillizer gun